Nadja is a Canadian duo of Aidan Baker (guitars, vocals, piano, woodwinds, drums) and Leah Buckareff (bass, vocals). Nadja began in 2003 as a solo project for Baker to explore the heavier and noisier side of his experimental ambient music performed mainly on the electric guitar. In 2005 Buckareff joined in order to make the project more than just a studio endeavour and to allow Nadja to perform live.

The band's name comes from Aidan's name spelled backwards in order to match the concept of a musical style different from his own work. The J replacing the I is, according to Aidan, a reference to the Nadja character from André Breton's book of the same name and Elina Löwensohn's character from the 1994 vampire movie. The duo are a married couple and are based in Berlin.

History
After several limited edition CD-R releases on various small labels worldwide, Nadja released its first official album Truth Becomes Death on Montreal's Alien8 Recordings in 2005. The duo has since released material on wider distributed labels and went through re-releasing older recordings either remastered or completely re-arranged, such as the newer Touched 2007 version back on Alien8 or the Bodycage album on Profound Lore Records/LP version on Equation.

They have performed in Canada, Belgium, the Netherlands, Finland, the United Kingdom, Argentina, Brazil, Chile, Japan, Norway and the United States, sharing the stage with, among others, artists as Kayo Dot, Knurl, Khanate, Francisco López, Isis, thisquietarmy, BHUTAN drone, stilte, Dronevil and Mare.

Musical style
The duo combines soundscape, electronics and atmospheric vocals with slow, epic riffs and dirge-like percussion, creating a slowly moving grand wall of music that has been described as doomgaze, drone, ambient-doom, and shoegazer-metal. Aidan noted that they prefer to call their style of music "ambient metal" or "ambient doom", though he is fond of the term "dreamsludge" as well.

Line-up
Aidan Baker – Guitars, piano, programming, woodwinds, vocals (2002–present)
Leah Buckareff – Bass, vocals, violin (2003–present)

Discography

Full-length
Touched (2003), CD-R: Deserted Factory Records
Skin Turns to Glass (2003), CD-R: NOTHingness REcords
Corrasion CD-R: (2003), Foreshadow Productions
Bodycage (2005), CD-R: NOTHingness REcords, (2006), CD: NOTHingness REcords, (2008), 2LP: Equation Records
Bliss Torn from Emptiness (2005), CD-R: Fargone Records
Truth Becomes Death (2005), CD: Alien8 Recordings, (2008) 2LP: Conspiracy Records
Thaumogenesis (2007), CD: aRCHIVE Recordings LP + untitled CD: IMPORTANT RECORDS
Radiance of Shadows (2007), CD: Alien8 Recordings, (2008) 2LP: Conspiracy Records
Desire in Uneasiness (2008), CD: Crucial Blast Records
The Bungled & the Botched (2008), CD: Consouling Sounds, (2009) LP: Blocks Recording Club
Belles Bêtes (2009), CD/LP: Beta-lactam Ring Records
When I See the Sun Always Shines on T.V. [Cover album] (2009), CD: The End Records
Under the Jaguar Sun (2009), 2CD/2LP: Beta-lactam Ring Records
Autopergamene (2010), CD: Essence Music
Don't Bring Me Monkeys [Cover album] (2011), Digital: Self Released
Excision (2012), 2CD/digital: Important Records
Dagdrøm (2012), CD/LP: Broken Spine Productions
Flipper (2013), Digital/LP: Oaken Palace Records
Queller (2014), CD/LP: Essence Music
Sv (2016), CD: Essence Music
The Stone Is Not Hit By The Sun, Nor Carved With A Knife (2016), CD/LP: Gizeh Records
Sonnborner (2018), LP: Broken Spine Productions, CD: Daymare Recordings
Seemannsgarn (2021), Digital: Broken Spine Productions
Luminous Rot (2021), Digital: Southern Lord Recordings
Labyrinthine (2022), CD: Broken Spine Productions

Compilation
Numbness (2009), CD: Happy Prince

EPs
I Have Tasted the Fire Inside Your Mouth (2004), CD-R: Deserted Factory Records
Base Fluid (2007), Digital: Foreshadow Productions
Guilted by the Sun (2007), CDEP & LP: Roadburn Records
Long Dark Twenties (2008), LP Single: Anthem Records
Trinity (2008), CD: Die Stadt Records
Trinitarian (2008), LP: Important Records
Clinging to the Edge of the Sky (2009), LP: Adagio830/ Vendetta a.k.a. xmesserx03
Ruins of Morning (2010), 10" : Substantia Innominata
Sky Burial (2010), CD/LP: Latitudes/  Southern Records

Splits and collaborations
Split with Moss (2003), CD-R: Foreshadow Productions
Absorption with Methadrone (2005), CD-R, NOTHingness REcords
We Have Departed the Circle Blissfully with Fear Falls Burning (2006), LP: Conspiracy Records
12012291920/1414101 with Atavist (2007), CD: Invada Records/ LP Kreation Records
S/T Nadja with Fear Falls Burning (2007), CD: Conspiracy Records
Live collaboration with Datashock (2007), Meudiademorte / Hlava Temple
magma to ice Nadja/ Netherworld (2008), CD: Fario
Untitled release with Year of No Light, Fear Falls Burning and Machu Picchu Mother Future(2008) LP: MusicFearSatan
Christ Send Light with Black Boned Angel (2008), CD/LP: Battlecruiser / Sound Devastation
II: Points at Infinity with Atavist (2008), CD: Profound Lore
Infernal Procession...And Then Everything Dies split with Atavist and Satori (2008), CD: Cold Spring
tümpisa nadja / 5/5/2000 -(2009), CD + LP accident prone records
Primitive North with A Storm of Light (2009),  Split CD/LP: Robotic Empire
S/T nadja / Black Boned Angel (2009), CD/LP 20 Buck Spin
Pyramids with Nadja with Pyramids (2009), CD: Hydra Head Records
 Nadja/ Kodiak (2009), CD/ LP Denovali Records
The Life and Death of a Wasp NADJA & OvO (2010), CD/ LP Broken Spine Records/ Adagio 830 & Vendetta Records
Dominium Visurgis Nadja & Troum (2010), CD Transgredient Records
NADJA & GALENA Konstruktion (2011) LP Adagio 830
The Primitive World with Vampillia (2012), CD is collage collective Records
Cystema Solari Nadja and Uochi Toki (2014), LP/DIGITAL: CORPOC

Rerecordings
Touched (2007), CD: Alien8 Recordings, (2008) LP: Conspiracy Records
Corrasion (2007), CD: Foreshadow Productions, (2009) LP: Basses Frequences
Bliss Torn from Emptiness (2008), CD: Profound Lore Records
Skin Turns to Glass (2008), CD: The End Records

Live albums
Trembled (2006, rereleased 2008), CD: Utech Records
Thaumoradiance (2007), CD: aRCHIVE Recordings

DVD
White Nights/Drone Fields (2010), Beta-lactam Ring Records

References

External links

Official homepage
Concert photos (2009-06-01) by Laurent Orseau
Official Bandcamp page

Canadian doom metal musical groups
Musical groups established in 2003
Drone metal musical groups
Post-metal musical groups
Heavy metal duos
Canadian musical duos
Utech Records artists
Important Records artists
Alien8 Recordings artists
The End Records artists
Male–female musical duos